Moolooite is a rare blue-green mineral with the formula Cu++(C2O4)·n(H2O) (n<1) (copper oxalate hydrate).  It was discovered by Richard M Clarke and Ian R Williams in Bunbury Well, Mooloo Downs station, Murchison, Western Australia in 1986. It has an orthorhombic crystalline structure, and is formed by the interaction of bird guano with weathering copper sulfides. It is used in plastics to color them blueish-green.

A second occurrence is reported from the Sainte-Marie-aux-Mines silver mining district of Vosges Mountains, France.

References

Copper(II) minerals
Oxalate minerals
Orthorhombic minerals
Minerals in space group 58
Minerals described in 1986